Messiah is an extreme metal band from Switzerland. The band has had three vocalists over its existence with vocalist Andy Kaina's tenure the longest. Guitarist R. B. Broggi has been the band's only constant member since inception.

Band history

Formation, studio album releases and reunion show (1984–2003)
Messiah's debut album, Hymn to Abramelin, was released in 1986 through Chainsaw Murder Records. Their second LP, titled Extreme Cold Weather, came out in 1987 and was re-issued on CD three years later by Nuclear Blast. The release also contained the band's debut album. The band then managed to sign to a German major metal label, Noise Records, which released their next album, Choir of Horrors, in 1991. Messiah released two more albums, Rotten Perish and Underground, through Noise, but disbanded in the mid-1990s. 

The band reunited for a show in 2003. Afterwards, the band stated they have no desire to reunite.

Reunion, Fatal Grotesque Symbols – Darken Universe, and Fracmont (2017–present) 
At the end of 2017, the band was asked by a friend and concert promoter to play a few secret shows in Lucerne, Switzerland. The band accepted, and following the shows, decided to start writing a new album in the beginning of 2018.

In June 2020, the band announced an EP titled Fatal Grotesque Symbols – Darken Universe will be released on 7 August, and that a full-length album titled Fracmont will be released a month later on 11 September, the band's first studio album in 26 years.

Band members

Current members
R. B. Broggi – guitars 
Patrick Hersche – bass 
Steve Karrer – drums

Former members
Rolf "Jazzi" Heer – drums 
Reto Wilhelm Kühne – bass, vocals 
Andre Steiner – guitars 
Dave Philips – bass 
Dani Raess – guitar 
Pete Schuler – drums 
Christofer Johnsson – vocals 
Oliver Koll – bass 
Andy Kaina – vocals

Timeline

Discography

Albums
Hymn to Abramelin (1986)
Extreme Cold Weather (1987)
Choir of Horrors (1991)
Rotten Perish (1992)
Underground (1994)
Fracmont (2020)

Live Albums
Reanimation, Live at Abart (2010)
The Choir of Horrors and Rotten Perish Era Live (2018)

EPs
Psychomorphia (1990)
The Ballad of Jesus (1994)
Fatal Grotesque Symbols – Darken Universe (2020)

Compilations
Powerthrash / The Infernal Thrashing (2004)
Space Invaders (2018)

DVDs
20 Years of Infernal Thrashing Madness (2004)

Demos
Demo 1984 (1984)
Infernal Thrashing (1985)
Powerthrash (1985)
Live Baar (1985)
Extreme Cold Weather (1986)

References

External links
[ Messiah] at Allmusic

Swiss death metal musical groups
Swiss thrash metal musical groups
Swiss heavy metal musical groups
Musical groups established in 1984
Musical groups disestablished in 1994
Musical groups reestablished in 2017
Noise Records artists
Massacre Records artists
Nuclear Blast artists